Keene/Elmhirst's Resort Water Aerodrome  is located  east of Keene, Ontario, Canada.

See also
Keene/Elmhirst's Resort Airport

References

Registered aerodromes in Ontario
Seaplane bases in Ontario